Hypselodoris bennetti is a species of colourful sea slug or dorid nudibranch, a marine gastropod mollusc in the family Chromodorididae.

Distribution
This nudibranch is found in Southeastern Australia from Queensland to Victoria.

Description
H. bennetti has a translucent white body which may have a blue, pink or purple hue, and a bright yellow mantle edge. There are red spots on its under body and dorsum running longitudinally along the centre and at the mantle edge. Some animals have yellow spots. The gills and rhinophores are white, outlined with pink or red. This species can reach a total length of at least 50 mm and has been observed feeding on sponges from the genus Psammocinia.

References

External links 
 An image of a mating pair at 

Chromodorididae
Gastropods described in 1864